Rodolphe Gilbert (born 12 December 1968) is a former French male professional tennis player.

Gilbert won the doubles title at the ATP Guaruja in 1991 partnering countryman Olivier Delaître. The left-handed Gilbert, who won over $1,100,000 in prize money, reached a doubles career high ranking of 50, in January 1996.

Career finals

Doubles (2 wins, 2 losses)

External links
 
 
 

1968 births
Living people
French male tennis players
Sportspeople from Seine-et-Marne